Carnot Airport  is an airstrip serving Carnot, a city in the Mambéré-Kadéï prefecture of the Central African Republic. The runway is on the western edge of the city.

See also

Transport in the Central African Republic
List of airports in the Central African Republic

References

External links 
OpenStreetMap - Carnot
OurAirports - Carnot Airport

Airports in the Central African Republic
Buildings and structures in Mambéré-Kadéï